Mantigue is a small island located about  off the coast of volcanic island province of Camiguin province in the Philippines. It used to be home to a fishing village until the government prohibited any locals from residing therein and declared the island a protected area and sanctuary for sea turtles. 

One side of the island is a white sand beach with corals offshore, and the opposite side provides a deep drop-off for snorkeling and diving. Both are open to the public during daytime only, where people can stay in cottages or swim in the sea.   

Mantigue Island can be reached by light water craft in 25–30 minutes from Barangays Benoni, San Roque or Binaliwan, all in the town of Mahinog. The provincial government of Camiguin mandates the local government of Mahinog as the official caretaker of the island.

See also
List of islands of the Philippines

References

External links
 Mantigue (Magsaysay) Island at OpenStreetMap

Islands of Camiguin
Beaches of the Philippines